Antonio Alexe (21 December 1969 – 21 January 2005) was a Romanian professional basketball player.

He played for Oradea (1988-1993), Szolnoki Olaj KK (Hungary, 1995-1998), Sopron (Hungary, 1999-2000), West Petrom Arad (2000-2002), Falco KC Szombathely (Hungary, 2002-2003) and CSU Asesoft Ploiesti (2003-2005). He died in a car accident. The Arena Antonio Alexe is named after him.

Personal life
He was born on 21 December 1969 in Constanţa. Alexe was married and had daughter, Paula (born 1995).

He died on 21 January 2005 in a car accident in Sinaia and over 1,500 people participated at his funeral.

Career

Club career
He started playing basketball at 11 years old. In 1988 he transferred to Dinamo Oradea, where he was trained by Dan Berceanu. With him in the team, Oradea finished 3rd in the 1991/92 Romanian League, achieving the best performance in the club's history. He was declared the MVP of the Romanian League (6 times) and the MVP of the Hungarian League (3 times).

International career
He led the junior national team to a 4th place at the 1990 FIBA Europe Under-18 Championship and a year later, as a captain of the youth team he finished 5th at the FIBA Under-19 World Cup in Edmonton, Canada.

Antonio Alexe Memorial Tournament
Antonio Alexe Memorial Tournament is organized in his honour.

2008 edition
Macedonia-Austria 91-66
Romania – Swis Lion Vrsec 79-72
Austria – Romania 83-72
Macedonia-Swis Lion Vrsec 87-73
Swis Lions Vrsec – Austria 68-63
Macedonia – Romania 77-70

Standings:

1.Macedonia
2.Romania
3.Swis Lion Vrsec
4.Austria

2010 edition 
CSU Atlassib Sibiu – Szolnok 71-64
CSM Oradea – BC Mureş Târgu Mureş 84-67
BC Mureş Târgu Mureş – Szolnok 66-61
CSM Oradea – CSU Atlassib Sibiu 72-83
BC Mureş Târgu Mureş – CSU Atalssib Sibiu 93-82
CSM Oradea – Szolnok 75-69

Standings:

|}

2011 edition
Marso Vagep Nyíregyháza – U Mobitelco Cluj-Napoca 67-88 
CSM Oradea – Factum Sport Debrecen 82-55
U Mobitelco – Factum Sport Debrecen 103- 69
CSM Oradea – Marso Vagep Nyíregyháza 92-66
Marso Vagep Nyíregyháza – Factum Sport Debrecen 80-67
CSM Oradea – U Mobitelco Cluj-Napoca 85-94

Standings:

|}

2012 edition
Albacomp Székesfehérvár - Atomerőmű SE 67-58 
CSM Oradea - U Mobitelco Cluj 80-72
U Mobitelco Cluj - Albacomp Székesfehérvár 73-70
CSM Oradea - Atomerőmű SE 73-68
U Mobitelco Cluj - Atomerőmű SE 91-70
CSM Oradea - Albacomp Székesfehérvár 93-57

2013 edition
CSM Oradea- Alba Székesfehérvár 87-77, BC Mureş-Marso Nyíregyháza 80-55, CSM Oradea-BC Mureş 88-74, Alba Székesfehérvár-Marso Nyíregyháza 97-58, BC Mureş-Alba Székesfehérvár 98-82, CSM Oradea-Marso Nyíregyháza 94-57.

References

1969 births
2005 deaths
CSU Asesoft Ploiești players
Falco KC Szombathely players
Romanian expatriate sportspeople in Hungary
Romanian men's basketball players
Road incident deaths in Romania
Soproni KC players
Sportspeople from Constanța
Szolnoki Olaj KK players
Guards (basketball)